Eupithecia polylibades is a moth in the family Geometridae. It is found in Lesotho, South Africa and Eswatini.

References

Moths described in 1916
polylibades
Moths of Africa